In enzymology, a 15-hydroxyicosatetraenoate dehydrogenase is an enzyme that catalyzes the chemical reaction

(15S)-15-hydroxy-5,8,11-cis-13-trans-icosatetraenoate + NAD(P)+  15-oxo-5,8,11-cis-13-trans-icosatetraenoate + NAD(P)H + H+

The 3 substrates of this enzyme are 15-Hydroxyicosatetraenoic acid (i.e. 15(S)-15-hydroxy-5,8,11-cis-13-trans-icosatetraenoate), NAD+, and NADP+, whereas its 4 products are 15-oxo-5,8,11-cis-13-trans-icosatetraenoate, NADH, NADPH, and H+.

This enzyme belongs to the family of oxidoreductases, specifically those acting on the CH-OH group of donor with NAD+ or NADP+ as acceptor. The systematic name of this enzyme class is (15S)-15-hydroxy-5,8,11-cis-13-trans-icosatetraenoate:NAD(P)+ 15-oxidoreductase. This enzyme is also called 15-hydroxyeicosatetraenoate dehydrogenase. This enzyme participates in arachidonic acid metabolism.

References

 

EC 1.1.1
NADPH-dependent enzymes
NADH-dependent enzymes
Enzymes of unknown structure